Cyclonic Storm Jawad was a weak tropical cyclone that caused major disruptions over Andhra Pradesh, Odisha and West Bengal in India while bringing heavy rainfall and strong winds over these states as a weakened system. The tenth depression, sixth deep depression and fifth cyclonic storm of the active 2021 North Indian Ocean cyclone season, its predecessor was first tracked by Joint Typhoon Warning Center (JTWC) in the South China Sea as an area of low pressure. It then moved west-northwestwards into the Gulf of Thailand, where it crossed into the Andaman Sea by December 1. Near midnight of that day, the JTWC issued a TCFA on the system and on the next day, the India Meteorological Department (IMD) upgraded the system to a depression after passing through the Nicobar Islands. Further intensification ensued as the depression tracked through environmental conditions favorable for strengthening, and the system was upgraded into a deep depression on December 3 and into a cyclonic storm by 06:00 UTC that day, with the IMD naming it Jawad. However, this intensification was short-lived, as the system weakened to a deep depression back due to wind shear.

Widespread preparations were conducted due to Jawad. School and train operations were disrupted and canceled, and disaster teams were deployed in Andhra Pradesh and Odisha for the storm. Individuals living in coastal areas were evacuated, including over 54,000 people in the former state. Essential stocks were also prepared for possible emergencies, as well as disaster relief. Two fatalities were confirmed from the system so far, both from Srikakulam. Both teenagers were crushed to their deaths by falling coconut trees.

Meteorological history 

Twelve hours later, the JMA would note this system as a west-northwestward moving low-pressure area. It then moved over the Andaman Sea from the Gulf of Thailand. They also evaluated the environment around the storm as "favorable", with strong outflow,  sea surface temperatures and moderate wind shear. Meanwhile, the IMD had already started to monitor this low-pressure area earlier at 03:00 UTC (8:30 IST), while it was located over southern Thailand. Nevertheless, it moved over the Nicobar Islands and into the Bay of Bengal around December 1, with the IMD also upgrading the system to a well-marked low-pressure on that day. However, moderate wind shear had displaced the system's convection to the northwest by 18:00 UTC that day. Shortly before that midnight, the JTWC issued a Tropical Cyclone Formation Alert (TCFA) on the system, as numerical guidance forecast models revealed further strengthening of the storm. On the next day, the low-pressure system turned to the northwest, before the IMD upgraded the storm into a depression, with the agency designating the storm as "BOB 07" at 12:00 UTC.

At 03:00 UTC (08:30 IST), the IMD further upgraded the system to a deep depression, as a Dvorak number of T 2.0 calculated for the system, indicating further organization. The deep depression took a west-northwestward track again, and approximately three hours later, the system strengthened into a cyclonic storm, with the IMD naming it Jawad, the fifth name from the naming lists of the annual cyclone season, which was submitted by Saudi Arabia, which means "generous" or "merciful" in Arabic. However, starting at 12:00 UTC, Jawad began to slow down, while retaining its organization. Possibly due to decreasing sea surface temperatures along the storm's track with unfavorable wind shear, Jawad lost its organization and the IMD downgraded the storm back into a deep depression by 12:00 UTC of December 4. This same reasoning was also used by the JTWC in the agency's final warning on the system, three hours earlier. At the same time by the next day, Jawad was further downgraded into a depression as it started to make a northwestward move, and by December 6 at 00:00 UTC, the system further degenerated into a well-marked low-pressure over the northwest Bay of Bengal without making landfall; its convection moved inland over West Bengal and Bangladesh, however.

Preparations

Andhra Pradesh and Odisha 
The state of Odisha was forecasted to brunt the most impacts from Jawad, according to the IMD. Several train operations of East Coast Railway, South Western Railway and South Eastern Railway were also canceled as a precaution of the brewing cyclone. As the precursor of the cyclone developed into a depression, orange and red rainfall alert was placed for the coastal areas of northern Andhra Pradesh and Odisha, respectively.

On 2 December 2021, Narendra Modi, the Prime Minister of India, presided a meeting to discuss the potential consequences and readiness of the states that Jawad may hit. There, he instructed the administration of these states to evacuate individuals "in time" and to make the essential services during the cyclone stable, along with disaster relief people. Residents in 13 districts of Odisha were also requested to evacuate while teams of National Disaster Response Force were positioned across the state that are seen to be impacted by the cyclone. Food, drinking water and essential supply stocks were also readied. School operations in Visakhapatnam and Srikakulam in Andhra Pradesh were halted while the Konark Festival and International Sand Art Festival, due to occur on December 1 were both canceled in Odisha. The residents living over Bhadrak's coastal areas in the latter were already evacuated while over 54,008 individuals at the former state were sheltered to safety in evacuation centers set up by the state administration.

West Bengal 
A 24-hour control center was set up by the Government of West Bengal as a preparation for the storm. Fishermen located over the Bay of Bengal and farmers and tourists inland West Bengal were also alerted for heavy rains and strong winds. Command rooms were set up as a preparation for the storm in the aforementioned state. Over 11,000 individuals were seen to be evacuated from Jawad, along with more people living near the shores to the safety shelters set up by the state government. Disaster teams were deployed in West Bengal, while the Indian Coast Guard warned many vessels to return to ports. Tourists in Digha, Mandarmani and Tajpur were also forced to cancel their bookings and reservations in the beach town due to the warnings imposed by the state. The NDRF teams situated in the state are also informing people about the possible effects of Jawad. In addition, tree branches were being cut, 188 evacuation shelters being set up and power system were checked. The various parts of Kolkata such as Dum Dum, Bidhannagar were also readied for the cyclone's possible effects. Due to possible storm surge being expected from the storm, over 20,000 individuals from Kakdwip, South 24 Parganas were sheltered to safe places, away from the coastline. Ferry services were also canceled.

Impacts

Andhra Pradesh 
The first two fatalities reported from Jawad are located at Srikakulam, first where a 17-year-old girl was killed by an uprooting coconut tree. The other was another teenager, which was killed due to the same reason. Heavy rainfall were experienced at the city, along with strong winds. Coastal areas over Andhra Pradesh and Odisha also began to see rainfall by December 3 in the evening. Despite these effects, only minor damages were recorded in Andhra Pradesh from Jawad as the system weakened prior to affecting the state.

Odisha 
The cities of Bhubaneswar and Cuttack also received rainfall from Jawad, with the former receiving  from the storm. This caused several traffic disruptions and some flooding in these areas. Many paddy crops, along with other miscellaneous were also reported to have been damaged and inundated with flooding, along with farming disruptions.

West Bengal 
From 4 December 2021, West Bengal started to experience rainfall from Jawad, first being centered over West and East Midnapore. A fishing vessel sank while the boat was being anchored in South 24 Parganas; no casualty was reported.
Despite these rainfall amounts, many reservoirs in the state was reported to have been rising in their water levels. Heavy rainfall was also reported in Kolkata, Howrah, Hooghly and forecasted for North 24 Parganas, South 24 Parganas, Nadia and Murshidabad.

See also 

Tropical cyclones in 2021
Weather of 2021
Cyclone Forrest
Cyclone Phailin
Typhoon Gay (1989)
Cyclones Matmo and Bulbul
Cyclone Yaas

Notes

References

External links 

 JTWC Best Track Data of Tropical Cyclone 05B (Jawad)
 05B.JAWAD from the U.S. Naval Research Laboratory

Tropical cyclones in 2021
2021 disasters in India
2021 North Indian Ocean cyclone season
Cyclonic storms
Tropical cyclones in India